The Warner & Swasey Company was an American manufacturer of machine tools, instruments, and special machinery. It operated as an independent business firm, based in Cleveland, from its founding in 1880 until its acquisition in 1980.  It was founded as a partnership in 1880 by Worcester Reed Warner (1846–1929) and Ambrose Swasey (1846–1937). The company was best known for two general types of products: astronomical telescopes and turret lathes. It also did a large amount of instrument work, such as equipment for astronomical observatories and military instruments (rangefinders, optical gunsights, etc.) The themes that united these various lines of business were the crafts of toolmaking and instrument-making, which have often overlapped technologically. In the decades after World War II, it also entered the heavy equipment industry with its acquisition of the Gradall brand.

History

In 1866, Swasey and Warner met as fellow apprentices at the Exeter Machine Works in Exeter, New Hampshire. Within a few years they went together to Pratt & Whitney in Hartford, Connecticut, which was one of the leading machine tool builders of the era. There they both rose through the ranks, with Warner rising to be in charge of an assembly floor and Swasey rising to be foreman of the gear-cutting department. There Swasey invented the epicycloidal milling machine for cutting true theoretical curves for the milling cutters used for cutting gears.

In 1880, Swasey and Warner resigned from Pratt & Whitney in order to start a machine-tool-building business together. They investigated Chicago as a place to build their works, but they perceived the Chicago of 1880 as too far west and lacking a sufficient labor pool of skilled machinists. So they went to Cleveland, Ohio, where their company would stay for the next century. They worked together for 20 years without a formal corporate agreement, during which time their partnership's principal products were various models of lathes and milling machines. From the beginning, the partners built both machine tools and telescopes, which reflected their interests in toolmaking, instrument-making, and astronomy.

After nearly 20 years of successful growth, the partners realized that their business was growing enough that it should be given a formal corporate structure, so in 1900 they reorganized it under the official name of The Warner & Swasey Company.

During the early- to mid-20th century, the company was well known in American industry. Its products, both turret lathes and instruments, played very prominent roles in the war efforts for both world wars. Warner & Swasey took part in the transition to numerical control (NC) and computer numerical control (CNC) machine tools during the 1950s through 1970s, but like many other machine tool builders during those decades, it ultimately was affected by the prevailing winds of merger and acquisition in the industry. It was acquired by Bendix Corporation in 1980.

Products

Telescopes

The first Warner & Swasey telescope, built in 1881, was sold to Beloit College for its new Smith Observatory and had a 9.5-inch lens made by Alvan Clark & Sons. Among the notable instruments the company built were the telescopes for Lick Observatory (1888, 36-inch, refracting); the United States Naval Observatory (1893); Yerkes Observatory (according to the 50th-anniversary book, this was a 40-inch refracting telescope completed in time for display at the World's Columbian Exposition of 1893, although its installation at Yerkes was apparently in 1897); and Canada's Dominion Astrophysical Observatory (1916, 72-inch, reflecting). In 1919, the company's founders donated their private observatory in East Cleveland, Ohio to Case Western Reserve University.  Today's Warner and Swasey Observatory grew from that facility.

The company's 50th-anniversary book describes the firm's giant-telescope-building work as unprofitable overall but a labor of technological love.

List of observatories with Warner & Swasey telescopes

Bosque Alegre Observatory, National University of Cordoba, ARG
Burrell Memorial Observatory, Baldwin Wallace University, USA
Crane Observatory, Washburn University, USA
Chabot Space & Science Center, Oakland, California, USA
Drake Municipal Observatory, Des Moines, Iowa, USA
Dominion Astrophysical Observatory, NRC, Canada
Dudley Observatory, miSci, Schenectady, NY, USA
Durfee High School, Fall River, Massachusetts, USA
Fuertes Observatory (Irving Porter Church Memorial Telescope), Cornell University, USA
Hildene Astronomy Club (Robert Todd Lincoln Telescope), Manchester, Vermont, USA
James Observatory, Millsaps College, Jackson, Mississippi,  USA
Kirkwood Observatory, Indiana University, USA
Lee Observatory, American University of Beirut, Lebanon
Lick Observatory, University of California, USA
McDonald Observatory (Otto Struve Telescope), University of Texas at Austin, USA
Moraine Farm Observatory (Col. Deeds 7" Refractor), Col. Deeds Homestead, currently owned by Kettering health Network, Dayton OH, USA
Painter Hall Observatory, University of Texas at Austin, USA
Perkins Telescope, Lowell Observatory, USA
McKim Observatory, DePauw University, USA
Mueller Observatory, Cleveland Museum of Natural History, USA
Ritter Observatory, University of Toledo, USA
Spacewatch 0.9-meter Telescope, Kitt Peak, University of Arizona, USA
Stephens Memorial Observatory (Cooley Telescope - 9-inch Refractor), Hiram College, USA
Swasey Observatory, Denison University, USA
Tate Laboratory, School of Physics and Astronomy, University of Minnesota, USA
United States Naval Observatory (USNO), United States Navy, USA
University of Illinois Observatory, Urbana, Illinois, USA
Theodor Jacobsen Observatory, University of Washington, USA
Warner and Swasey Observatory, Case Western Reserve University, USA
Yerkes Observatory, Williams Bay, Wisconsin, USA

Turret lathes

Warner & Swasey was one of the premier brands in heavy turret lathes between the 1910s and 1960s. Its chief competitors in this market segment included Jones & Lamson (Springfield, VT, USA), Gisholt (Madison, WI, USA), and Alfred Herbert Ltd (Coventry, UK).

Military instruments

Military instrument contracts were an important line of work for the company. The U.S. government referred many problems concerning such instruments to the company during the Spanish–American War (1898). Instruments produced included "range finders of several types, gun-sight telescopes, battery commanders' telescopes, telescopic musket sights, and prism binoculars". Presumably, the range finders included the company's depression position finder. During World War I, three important kinds of instrument were produced: "musket sights, naval gun sights, and panoramic sights".

Construction equipment

In 1946 Warner & Swasey Company acquired the patent rights to manufacture the Gradall telescopic boom excavator from the brothers Ray and Koop Ferwerda with their manufacturing company, the FWF Corporation, of Beachwood, Ohio.  The Gradall, a type of hydraulic machinery,  became a business of the new owner as the Gradall Division with operations in Cleveland. In the year 1946, the Gradall was the first production hydraulic excavator that was designed and manufactured in the United States. In July 1950, Gradall manufacturing operations were moved to New Philadelphia, Ohio, where it continues, in 2017, as Gradall Industries, Inc., a global manufacturer of telescopic boom excavators and industrial maintenance machinery. Gradall Industries, Inc. is a business unit of the Alamo Group of Seguin, Texas. 

The foundation of the Warner & Swasey Construction Equipment Division with five product lines was started in 1946 with the development of the first production hydraulic excavator; the GRADALL®. This machine was new technology for the industry and was highly versatile and productive for a variety of work. The DUPLEX TRUCK® Company of Lansing, Michigan, a heavy duty and specialized truck manufacturer was acquired in 1955 to supply truck chassis for the GRADALL and future Warner & Swasey backhoe excavator and crane products. In 1957 the Company sought a broader market penetration into the hydraulic excavator market. It acquired the Badger Machine Company of Winona, Minnesota, with its six HOPTO® hydraulic excavator models which complimented the Gradall models. The Company acquired in 1967, the Sargent Engineering Corporation of Fort Dodge, Iowa, a manufacturer of hydraulic cranes. Their six SARGENT HYDRA-TOWER® CRANE models enabled the company to move into another large segment of the construction industry using hydraulic machinery. That same year the Company partnered with a Canadian paper industry association in the manufacture of the ARBOMATIK® a line of hydraulic tree harvesting equipment. Through corporate diversity into hydraulic construction equipment, the growing popularity and productivity of this type of hydraulic machinery yielded strong business growth for the Warner & Swasey company of Cleveland, Ohio during the years of 1946 through 1977.

See also
James Hartness, president of competitor Jones & Lamson Machine Company, a contemporary of Worcester Reed Warner and Ambrose Swasey who shared their avocations of developing better telescopes and better turret lathes.

References

Bibliography
 
 Grant, James H. (2012), LOAD HANDLER Gradall LOED Materials Handler, New Philadelphia, Ohio, USA: JHG Partners, LLC, .

Further reading

External links

26-inch USNO Refracting Telescope
The Beautiful Early Telescopes of Warner & Swasey, Including the J.A. Brashear and C.S. Hastings Optical Collaboration, abstract of lecture by John W. Briggs, Yerkes Observatory, at the 112th annual meeting of the Astronomical Society of the Pacific, Pasadena, CA, July 15, 2000
International Catalog of Sources: Warner & Swasey Company records to 1919
1900-1985
The story of Warner & Swasey telescopes by Ernest N. Jennison
Smith Observatory History
Warner & Swasey Company at Abandoned

Companies established in 1880
Instrument-making corporations
Machine tool builders
Defunct technology companies of the United States
Telescope manufacturers
Manufacturing companies based in Cleveland
1880 establishments in Ohio
Bendix Corporation